Maps is an EP by Three Mile Pilot, released on July 24, 2012, by Temporary Residence Limited.

Track listing

Personnel 
Adapted from the Maps liner notes.

Three Mile Pilot
 Pall Jenkins – vocals, guitar
 Armistead Burwell Smith IV – bass guitar, backing vocals
 Tom Zinser – drums, accordion

Production and additional personnel
 Kris Poulin – mixing
 Three Mile Pilot – production, recording

Release history

References

External links 
 

2012 EPs
Temporary Residence Limited albums
Three Mile Pilot albums